Baile Bricín ("The Vision of Bricín") is a late Old Irish or Middle Irish prose tale, in which St Bricín(e), abbot of Túaim Dreccon (Tomregan), is visited by an angel, who reveals to him the names of the most important future Irish churchmen. The text can be regarded as an ecclesiastical counterpart to Baile in Scáil, which provided a model for the structure of the tale and which is referred to in § 58.

Summary
One night, Bricín of Túaim Dreccon heard the noise of an Easter celebration in heaven and asked God for any news. An angel descended from heaven and revealed to him the names of the most famous future churchmen in Ireland as well as the outlines of Bricín's future career. Most of the text is occupied by this list, which includes a variety of details about the clerics in question. The text ends with a brief note on St Patrick's intervention for the Irish on Judgment Day.

Manuscripts
London, British Library, Harley MS 5280, fols. 44b–48a.
London, British Library, Egerton MS 1782, fols. 17a–19a.

Notes

Edition
Meyer, Kuno (ed.). "Baile Bricín." Zeitschrift für celtische Philologie 9 (1913): 449–57. Edition available from CELT

References

Smith, Tom. The kennings in 'Baile Bricín'. A source for 10th century Irish church history 
Murray, Kevin. "Baile in Scáil and Baile Bricín." Éigse 33 (2002): 49-56.
Old-Irish List- An English translation of Baile Bricín.
Eugene O'Curry: Lectures on the Manuscript Materials of Ancient Irish History, pp. 48–51 and 418-419.
Full text of "Lectures on the Manuscript Materials of Ancient Irish History" in various formats (PDF, JP2, etc)

Early Irish literature
Irish texts